Iași County is a county (județ) of Romania, in Western Moldavia, with the administrative seat at Iași. It is the most populous county in Romania, after the Municipality of Bucharest (which has the same administrative level as that of a county).

Geography

This county has a total area of 5,476 km2. It lies on a plain between the Siret River and the Prut River. Two other rivers run through the county: the Bahlui River (on the banks of which lies the city of Iași) and the Jijia River.

Neighbours

Republic of Moldova to the east - Ungheni District.
Neamț County to the west.
Botoșani County and Suceava County to the northwest.
Vaslui County to the south.

Demographics 

As of 20 October 2011 census, Iași County had a population of 772,348. On the other hand, according to the 2012 data provided by the County Population Register Service, the total registered population of the county is as high as 873,662 people.

 Romanians - 97.61%
 Romani - 1.55%
 Lipovans - 0.39%
 Others - 0.3%

The population of Iași County nowadays is nearly double of what it was sixty years ago.

County government 

The Iași County Council, renewed at the 2020 local elections, consists of 36 counsellors, with the following party composition:

Economy
This county is predominantly agricultural, due to its topography. Industry is concentrated in the cities. 
The principal industries are:
 Software
 Pharmaceuticals
 Automotive
 Metallurgy and heavy-equipment manufacturing
 Electronics & Electrotechnics
 Textiles
 Food production

Tourism

City of Iași is the most important city in Moldavia and one of the most important social, cultural and business centres in Romania. It has the oldest University in the country, and, until the formation of the United Principalities, it was the capital of Moldavia.

Some of the tourist destinations in the county:
 City of Iași and its environs (the Seven hills of Iași);
 Alexandru Ioan Cuza Memorial Palace in Ruginoasa;
 Cucuteni - Neolithic archeological site;
 Cotnari and Bohotin vineyards; 
 Museum of Vineyard and Wine in Hârlău;
 Hadâmbu and Dobrovăț Monasteries;
 Miclăușeni Castle and Monastery; 
 Vasile Alecsandri Memorial House in Mircești;
 Constantin Negruzzi Museum in Hermeziu;
 Cezar Petrescu Museum in Cotnari;
 City of Pașcani, and towns of Târgu Frumos and Hârlău;
 Strunga health resort.

Communities

Iași County has 2 municipalities, 3 towns, and 93 communes
Municipalities (as of 2011 census)
Iași - population: 290,422 (and 465,477 (as of 2014) in the urban area)
Pașcani - population: 33,745
Towns
Hârlău
Podu Iloaiei
Târgu Frumos

Communes
Alexandru Ioan Cuza
Andrieșeni
Aroneanu
Balș
Bălțați
Bârnova
Belcești
Bivolari
Brăești
Butea
Ceplenița
Ciohorăni
Ciortești
Ciurea
Coarnele Caprei
Comarna
Costești
Costuleni
Cotnari
Cozmești
Cristești
Cucuteni
Dagâța
Deleni
Dobrovăț
Dolhești
Drăgușeni
Dumești
Erbiceni
Fântânele
Focuri
Golăiești
Gorban
Grajduri
Gropnița
Grozești
Hălăucești
Hărmănești
Heleșteni
Holboca
Horlești
Ion Neculce
Ipatele
Lespezi
Lețcani
Lungani
Mădârjac
Mircești
Mironeasa
Miroslava
Miroslovești
Mogoșești
Mogoșești-Siret
Moșna
Moțca
Movileni
Oțeleni
Plugari
Popești
Popricani
Prisăcani
Probota
Răchiteni
Răducăneni
Rediu
Românești
Roșcani
Ruginoasa
Scânteia
Schitu Duca
Scobinți
Sinești
Sirețel
Stolniceni-Prăjescu
Strunga
Șcheia
Șipote
Tansa
Tătăruși
Țibana
Țibănești
Țigănași
Todirești
Tomești
Trifești
Țuțora
Ungheni
Valea Lupului
Valea Seacă
Vânători
Victoria
Vlădeni
Voinești

Historical county

The county was located in the northeastern part of Greater Romania, in the northeast of the region of Moldavia. Today, most of the territory of the former county is part of the current Iași County. In the eastern part of the county, the county included a part of the left bank of the Prut River, now in the territory of the Republic of Moldova. It was bordered to the north by the counties of Botoșani and Bălți, to the east by Lăpușna County, to the south by the counties of Fălciu and Vaslui, and to the west by the counties of Roman and Baia.

Administration

In 1938, the county was divided into six districts (plăși):
Plasa Bahlui, headquartered at Podu Iloaiei
Plasa Cârligătura, headquartered at Târgu Frumos
Plasa Codru, headquartered at Buciumii (at that time a commune, now Bucium District in the city of Iași)
Plasa Copou, headquartered at Iași
Plasa Turia, headquartered at Șipotele
Plasa Ungheni, headquartered at Ungheni-Târg, now the city of Ungheni in the Republic of Moldova

Iasi County included two urban localities: Iaşi (county seat) and urban commune Târgu Frumos, located at the western border of the county.

Population 
According to the 1930 census data, the county population was 275,796 inhabitants, 81.6% Romanians, 14.6% Jews, 0.6% Russians, 0.5% Hungarians, 0.4% Germans, as well as other minorities. From the religious point of view, the population was 82.0% Eastern Orthodox, 14.9% Jewish, 2.3% Roman Catholic, as well as other minorities.

Urban population 
In 1930, the county's urban population was 107,804 inhabitants, 102,872 in Iaşi and 4,932 in Târgu Frumos, comprising 60.8% Romanians, 33.6% Jews, 0.9% Germans, 0.9% Russians, as well as other minorities. In the urban area, languages were Romanian (72.5%), followed by Yiddish (22.2%), Russian (1.8%), German (0.9%), as well as other minorities. From the religious point of view, the urban population was composed of Eastern Orthodox (61.4%), Jewish (34.4%), Roman Catholic (3.0%), as well as other minorities.

References

External links
Iași County - A brief history at agerpres.ro
Iasi - the county of centuries-old trees

 
Counties of Romania
1879 establishments in Romania
1938 disestablishments in Romania
1940 establishments in Romania
1950 disestablishments in Romania
1968 establishments in Romania
States and territories established in 1879
States and territories disestablished in 1938
States and territories established in 1940
States and territories disestablished in 1950
States and territories established in 1968